Archeria serpyllifolia, commonly known as thyme archeria, is a species of shrub in the family Ericaceae.  It is endemic to Tasmania, Australia.

References

External links
Archeria serpyllifolia at The Plant List
Archeria serpyllifolia at the Encyclopedia of Life
Archeria serpyllifolia at the Australian Understory Network
Archeria serpyllifolia at the UTAS Epacridaceae Species List

Epacridoideae
Flora of Tasmania
Taxa named by Joseph Dalton Hooker
Plants described in 1860